Colombia competed at the 2016 Winter Youth Olympics in Lillehammer, Norway from 12 to 21 February 2016. The country made its debut at the Winter Youth Olympics.

Alpine skiing

Colombia qualified a one boy athlete.

Boys

See also
Colombia at the 2016 Summer Olympics

References

Nations at the 2016 Winter Youth Olympics
Colombia at the Youth Olympics
2016 in Colombian sport